Doryphoribius is a genus of water bear or moss piglet, a tardigrade in the class Eutardigrada.

Species
 Doryphoribius bertolanii Beasley and Pilato, 1987
 Doryphoribius doryphorus (Binda and Pilato, 1969)
 Doryphoribius dupliglobulatus Ito, 1995
 Doryphoribius evelinae (Marcus, 1928)
 Doryphoribius flavus (Iharos, 1966)
 Doryphoribius gibber Beasley and Pilato, 1987
 Doryphoribius koreanus Moon, Kim and Bertolani, 1994
 Doryphoribius korganovae Biserov, 1994
 Doryphoribius macrodon Binda, Pilato and Dastych, 1980
 Doryphoribius maranguensis Binda and Pilato, 1995
 Doryphoribius mariae Pilato and Binda, 1991
 Doryphoribius neglectus Pilato and Lisi, 2004
 Doryphoribius pilatoi Bertolani, 1984
 Doryphoribius polynettae Biserov, 1988
 Doryphoribius qinlingense Li, Su and Yu, 2004
 Doryphoribius quadrituberculatus Kaczmarek and Michalczyk, 2004
 Doryphoribius turkmenicus Biserov, 1999
 Doryphoribius zappalai Pilato 1971
 Doryphoribius zyxiglobus (Horning, Schuster and Grigarick, 1978)

References

External links

Parachaela
Tardigrade genera
Polyextremophiles